The Associação dos Escoteiros de Portugal (AEP, Scout Association of Portugal) is a youth organization concerned with education and the development of civil character. It was the first Scouting organization in Portugal, being established in 1913, and was a founding member of the World Organization of the Scout Movement (WOSM).  Unlike most Scouting groups in Portugal, the AEP is not tied to any denomination or religion, and, since 1979, is open to youth of both genders, ages 6 to 21.

The association is a member of the Comunidade do Escutismo Lusófono (Community of Lusophone Scouting).

Program
The AEP promotes social values within a humanist and non-military perspective. It encourages  participation in cultural activities and sports, as well as providing health education.

Program sections
Its members are divided into the following divisions: 
Ages 7 to 10, Alcateia, or Cub Scouts
Ages 10 to 14, Escoteiros (júnior), or Boy Scouts
Ages 14 to 17, Exploradores (sénior), or Explorer Scouts
Ages 17 to 21, Clã, (Rover Scouts)
Adults are welcome as supervisors

Any youngster can enter the AEP directly into the corresponding Age Division without having participated in the previous divisions. Adults may either enter existing troops or can promote the creation of new groups of Scouts.

Mixing genders with the same patrol did have some problems, so generally patrols are one gender or the other.

Scout Motto

Sempre Pronto, Always Ready

Scout Promise

Prometo por minha Honra fazer o meu melhor por:
Cumprir os meus deveres para com a minha Fé e a Pátria; 
Auxiliar o Próximo em todas as circunstâncias; 
Viver segundo a Lei do Escoteiro.

On my honor I promise to do my best
to fulfill my duties to my faith and my country,
to help my fellow man in all circumstances,
and to live according to the Scout Law.

Scout Law
O Escoteiro é verdadeiro e a sua palavra é sagrada.A Scout speaks the truth and his word is holy.
O Escoteiro é leal.A Scout is loyal.
O Escoteiro é prestável.A Scout is trustworthy.
O Escoteiro é amigo de todos e irmão dos demais escoteiros. A Scout is a friend to everybody and a brother to other Scouts.
O Escoteiro é cortês. A Scout is courteous.
O Escoteiro é respeitador e protector da natureza. A Scout is respectful and protective of nature.
O Escoteiro é responsável e disciplinado. A Scout is responsible and well disciplined.
O Escoteiro é alegre e sorri perante as dificuldades. A Scout is joyful and smiles in times of difficulties.
O Escoteiro é económico, sóbrio e respeitador dos bens dos outros. A Scout is thrifty and respects the possessions of others.
O Escoteiro é íntegro no pensamento, palavra e acções. A Scout is straightforward in thought, word and deeds.

References
This article is based in part on material from the Portuguese Wikipedia.

External links 
 Associação dos Escoteiros de Portugal in Portuguese and English;
  Nielsen, Harriet Bjerrum (2003) "Chapter 6: Doing Gender in Portugal" in One of the Boys?: Doing Gender in Scouting

World Organization of the Scout Movement member organizations
Scouting and Guiding in Portugal
Youth organizations established in 1913
1913 establishments in Portugal